The following is an alphabetical list of previous cast members of the SABC 2 soap opera 7de Laan, sorted by the performer's last name. The role the performer played and the dates when the performer appeared (when available) are listed alongside the performer.

A

B
 Jacques Blignaut - Vince Meintjies
 Ivan Botha - Peter van Heerden
 Quinne Brown Huffman - Connie Vosloo

C
 Werner Coetser - Bernard Jordaan (?–2016)
 Corné Crous - Kim Conradie (?-2016)

D
 Jo da Silva - Gita McGregor (?-2016)
 Melanie du Bois - Felicity Daniels Croukamp (?-2016)

E
 Vinette Ebrahim - Chamaine Meintjies (2000–2019), Vivian Williams

F
 Liaan Ferreira

G
 Mila Guy - Lana van Deventer

H
 Steve Hofmeyr - Brandt van den Bergh
 Heino Schmidt - Altus De Bryn

I

J
 Hennie Jacobs - Diederik Greyling
 Theodore Jantjies - Xander Meintjies (2005–2020)

K
 Tony Kgoroge - Gcobani Mthathi

L
 Diann Lawrenson - Paula van der Lecq-de Bruyn
 Francois Lensley - Marko Greyling

M
 Dann-Jacques Mouton - Justin Booysen
 Salamina Mosese - Nthabiseng Masilo 
 Marcus Muller - Andre Vosloo

N
 Denise Newman - Daleen Meintjies

O

P
 Nico Panagio - George Kyriakis
 Anelisa Phewa - Sifiso (?-2016)
 Pierre van Pletzen - "Oubaas" Septimus van Zyl (2000–2017)
 Elma Postma - Dezi Terreblanche

Q

R
 Deánré Reiners - Shawn Basson
 Sabelo Radebe - Rhulani Chauke

S
 Blyde Smit - Gabby Kemp
 Linda Sokhulu - Tumi Selepe 
 Neil Sandilands - Bart Kruger
 Masego Sehoole - Pulane
 Shaleen Surtie-Richards - Dorothy Daniels

T
 Themsie Times - Maria Zibula (2003?-2016)

U
 Amalia Uys - San-Mari van Graan

V
 Karin van der Laag - Hettie Bothma
 Wilhelm van der Walt - Tyrone 'Ty' Prinsloo (?-2016)

W
 Hannelie Warren - Augusta Visagie 
 Annelisa Weiland - Hilda de Kock (2000–2019)
 Marius Weyers - Tim Jordaan
 Rubin Wissing     - Ludo Venter

X

Y

Z

See also

References

South African soap opera actors
Lists of soap opera characters